Moga is a city in the Indian state of Punjab. It was made a part and headquarters of the Moga district (the 17th District in the state) on 24 November 1995, by the then Chief Minister Harcharan Singh Brar. Before becoming a district, Moga was a part of Faridkot District as a tehsil. Moga is situated on the National Highway 95 (NH-95 Ferozpur-Ludhiana road). The area of Dharamkot block with 150 villages has been merged into Moga district, which falls under the jurisdiction of Ferozpur division.

Etymology 
The name of Moga may be ultimately derived from the Indo-Scythian king, Maues, who invaded and ruled the area in the 1st century BCE after conquering the Indo-Greek polities of the region.

History

Ancient Era 
Structures and sites dating before the reign of the Mughal emperor Akbar are exceedingly rare due to the changing course of the Sutlej river throughout the centuries. As a result, very few sites dating back to antiquity have been uncovered in the local area of Moga. This effect is more pronounced in the western parts of the district.

The location of ancient villages and towns can be inferred to the present of mounds of earth, brick, and pottery that have been excavated called thehs. These mounds are evidence that the banks of the river were inhabited in ancient times. A number of coins have been discovered at the site of these mounds.

Indus Valley Civilization 
Sites identified as belonging to the Indus Valley Civilization have been discovered in the area. Scholars have linked these finds to other sites uncovered in the Rupnagar area of Punjab.

Vedic Period 
The composition of the Rigveda is proposed to have occurred in the Punjab circa 1500 and 1200 BCE.

Post-Vedic Period (After 600 BCE) 
The region of Moga belongs to the Malwai cultural zone, named after the ancient Malava tribe whom inhabited the area in ancient times. During the reign of Porus in the 4th century BCE, the southern area of Punjab was ruled by both the Kshudrakas and Malavas. Some scholars believe they were pushed southwards due to martial and social pressures occurring in the north. Alexander of Macedon warred with the Malavas for control of the region. This wrestle for power is recorded as being fierce and bitter in Greek historical accounts. After the withdrawal of Macedonian forces in the area, the Malavas joined with anti-Greek forces to usurp Hellenistic power and control of the region, leading to the formation of the Mauryan dynasty.

The decline of the Mauryan dynasty coincided with an invasion of Bactrian Greeks, whom successfully took control of the region in the second century BCE. This seizure of power in the Punjab by the Bactrians led to the migration of the Malavas from the area to Rajasthan, and from there to the now-called Malwa plateau of Central India covering southern rajasthan and western Madhya Pradesh.

Mediaeval Era 
The area is believed to have been under the writ of the Punwar clan of Rajputs during the early-mediaeval period. They were headquartered in Janer, at the old riverbed location of the Sutlej river, over six kilometres north of the present-day city of Moga. Later on, the Bhati clan of Rajputs, originating from Jaisalmer, established themselves in the area, superseding the previous Punwars for authority of the region.

Jat tribes, whom had been practicing migratory, nomadic-pastoralism for much of their recorded history, began to permanently settle the Moga area during this time and take up a sedentary lifestyle of settled agriculture. First of them being the Dhaliwal clan, who firmly established themselves southeast of Moga at Kangar. They appear to have possibly obtained high repute, seeing as a woman of the clan, Dharm, who was the daughter of Chaudhary Mihr Mitha Dhaliwal, was wedded to the Mughal emperor Akbar. The Gill clan of Jats, originally based in Bathinda, dispersed to the western parts of Moga district around this time. At the end of the 16th century, the Sidhu clan of Jats migrated northwards to the area from Rajasthan. A branch of the Sidhus, the Brars, established themselves in the south of Gill territory, pushing its former inhabitants northwards whilst taking control of their key places in the process. The Brars founded a chieftainship at Kot Kapura, 40 kilometres west of present-day Moga, and rebelled against the overlordship of Nawab Ise Khan, the Manj governor. Most of the Jat tribes of the local area were converted to Sikhism by the missionary works of the seventh Guru of the Sikhs, Har Rai.

In 1715 CE, Nawab Ise Khan, the Manj governor, stirred a rebellion against the Mughal hegemony but was defeated and killed. In 1760 CE, the ascendency of Sikh power became grounded after the defeat of Adina Beg, who was the last Mughal governor of Lahore.

Modern Era

Sikh Period 
The forces of Tara Singh, the misldar of the Dallewalia Misl of the Sikh Confederacy, led incursions into modern-day Moga district, all the way to Ramuwala and Mari. Fortresses (ਕਿਲਾ Kilā in Punjabi) were constructed at both of these places by the Sikh misl. The local nawab of Kot Ise Khan in modern-day Moga district became a protectorate of the Ahluwalia Misl. In 1763-64 CE, Gurja (Gujar) Singh, his brother Nusbaha Singh, and his two nephews, Gurbaksh Singh and Mastan Singh, of the Bhangi Misl, crossed the Sutlej river after a sacking of Kasur and gained control of the Firozepur area (including Moga) whilst Jai Singh Gharia, another band from the same quarters, seized Khai, Wan, and Bazidpur, and subordinated them.

British Period 
During the First Anglo-Sikh War, the forces of the Sikh Empire crossed the river Sutlej on the 16th of December, 1845, and fought battles at Mudki, Firozshah, Aliwal, and Sabraon. The Sikh forces were defeated by the British and retreated back beyond the Sutlej. After the war, the British acquired all former territory of the Lahore Darbar south and east of the Sutlej. When the Sutlej campaign drew to a close at the end of 1846, the territories of Khai, Baghuwala, Ambarhar, Zira, and Mudki, with portions of Kot Kapura, Guru Har Sahai, Jhumba, Kot Bhai, Bhuchcho, and Mahraj were added to the Firozepur district. Other acquisitions by the British were divided between the Badhni and Ludhiana districts. In 1847, the Badhni district was dissolved and the following areas were incorporated into the Firozepur district: Mallanwala, Makhu, Dharmkot, Kot Ise Khan, Badhni, Chuhar Chak, Mari, and Sadasinghwala.

During the Mutiny of 1857, there were reports of a Roman Catholic church being burnt down amongst other buildings of the colonial establishment in Firozepur district during sparks of tension.

During the late 19th century, the Kuka movement was prevalent in the areas of Moga, with many of its followers drawing from the laypersons of the district. The Kukas are believed to be one of the first resistance movement of the subcontinent towards Indian independence from European powers.

During the Indian Independence Movement, many revolutionaries came from Moga district. Many of them were tried and executed as a result of their activities against the colonial government.

Demographics

As per provisional data of 2011 census Moga urban agglomeration had a population of 159,897, out of which males were 84,808 and females were 75,089. The effective literacy rate was 81.42 per cent.

 India census, the town of Moga had a population of 124,624. Males constitute 54% of the population and females 46%. Moga has an average literacy rate of 68%, higher than the national average of 59.5%: male literacy is 71%, and female literacy is 66%. In Moga, 11% of the population is under 6 years of age.

Education
Below is the list of notable educational institutes in Moga:
 Sacred Heart School, Moga
 Kitchlu Public School
 Mount Litera Zee School, Moga
 National Convent Senior Secondary School
 Baba Kundan Singh Memorial Law College, Moga
 ISF Colleges of Pharmacy , Moga

Connectivity

Road connectivity 
Moga is well connected by road to the following nearby cities, by the following highway routes:

NH5 to Chandigarh and Shimla in the northeast and to Ferozpur in the West

Notable people
 
Narinder Singh Kapany, Indian-born American physicist, known for his works in fibre optics. 
Baba Gurinder Singh Ji, Fifth and Present Satguru of Radha Soami Satsang Beas.
Jarnail Singh Bhindranwale, 14th jathedar of the Sikh religious institution Damdami Taksal, born in the village of Rode.
Lala Lajpat Rai, Indian freedom fighter
Lachhman Singh Gill, Chief Minister of Punjab
Sonu Sood, Indian film actor 
Dharampreet was a well known Punjabi singer hailed from Bilaspur town near Moga
Harmanpreet Kaur, Indian cricketer
Joginder Singh Sahnan, Indian Army soldier, and recipient of the Param Vir Chakra for his efforts in the Sino-Indian War.
Harpreet Brar, Indian cricketer

References

External links

 District Census Handbook - Moga District

 
Cities and towns in Moga district